The Platino Award for Best Series Creator (Spanish: Premio Platino al Mejor creador de miniserie o teleserie) is one of the Platino Awards, Ibero-America's film awards presented annually by the Entidad de Gestión de Derechos de los Productores Audiovisuales (EGEDA) an the Federación Iberoamericana de Productores Cinematográficos y Audiovisuales (FIPCA). 

It was first introduced in 2021 for the 8th Platino Awards alongside the supporting acting categories in film. Spanish showrunner Aitor Gabilondo was the first recipient of the award for his work in the HBO Europe historical drama Patria.

Winners and nominees

2020s

References

External links
Official site

Platino Awards
Awards established in 2021